Dream Defenders is an American  group aimed at ending police and prisons (especially private prisons) as part of their policy and is geared towards people of color who share the goal of multi-racial organizing, among other goals. They espouse to end the school-to-prison pipeline, by ending prisons, police, and redefining notions of freedom and safety.

History and founding 
Dream Defenders was founded after a group of activists marched from Daytona to Sanford, Florida in order to protest Trayvon Martin's death and the failure to arrest his killer George Zimmerman. Gabriel Pendas,  and Phillip Agnew knew each other from activist work at Florida A&M University, and came together to plan an event. They contacted Ciara Taylor and Nelini Stamp - other activists with similar goals.

Ciara Taylor 

Taylor, one of the founders, grew up in the suburbs in Florida and attended Florida A&M University in Tallahassee. She served as both the political director and the director of political consciousness at Dream Defenders. In high school, Taylor protested the United States 2000 presidential election, between Al Gore and George W. Bush, after Bush was elected president. Taylor felt frustrated and hopeless in this process because she felt as though she could not actively influence the decision being made about her soon-to-be president. She continued this activism into college at Florida A&M, where she advocated for living wages for campus workers and advocated against budget cuts that defunded her major a year before she graduated.

Activist work 
In July 2013, Dream Defenders occupied the Florida State Capitol building for 31 days. The demonstration was in response to the decision of the Trayvon Martin case, in which George Zimmerman was acquitted for Martin's murder. with the aim of ending and raising awareness of Florida’s Stand Your Ground self-defense law. After 31 days, House Speaker Will Weatherford agreed to speak with them about Stand Your Ground. A member of the organization, Dr. Armen Henderson, was arrested while preparing to help provide free COVID-19 testing to homeless populations.

References

External links
 Dream Defenders - official site

Human rights organizations based in the United States